Euchaetogyne is a genus of bristle flies in the family Tachinidae.

Species
Euchaetogyne roederi (Williston, 1893)

References

Dexiinae
Diptera of North America
Tachinidae genera
Taxa named by Charles Henry Tyler Townsend